Nicolás Armando Muñoz Jarvis (born 21 December 1981) is a Panamanian professional footballer, who plays as a forward.

Club career
Nicknamed Yuyu, Muñoz has spent most of his career in his native Panama and in El Salvador, but also had a stint in Colombia with Envigado, whom he left for Salvadoran side Chalatenango in 2004.

He also played for FAS and Águila, to whom he returned after a shortlived loan spell in Portugal with Belenenses, and in summer 2008 he signed with Alianza.

He moved on to Vista Hermosa in January 2009 and after a second spell at Águila he returned to Panama in February 2010 to play for Árabe Unido.

In 2012, he signed for Isidro Metapán his contract was extended with a year in May 2013. Muñoz, who had scored seven of Isidro Metapán's previous nine CCL goals, continued his amazing touch.

On October 24, 2013 he became the third ever player to score 4 goals in a CCL match against Los Angeles Galaxy, all which Nicolás Muñoz scored solo.

In January 2015, Muñoz rejoined Águila, after Isidro Metapán declined to renew his contract and in April he scored the club's 1000th goal in Salvadoran league history.

In 2017, Nicolás Muñoz joined Luis Ángel Firpo for the Clausura 2017 tournament, after being released by Águila the previous tournament.

In 2018, Muñoz signed with Pasaquina for the Clausura 2018 tournament.

International career
He made his debut for Panama in a November 2006 friendly match against El Salvador and has, as of 10 June 2015, earned a total of 13 caps, scoring 1 goal. He represented his country at the 2007 and 2009 CONCACAF Gold Cups.

International goals
Scores and results list Panama's goal tally first.

Honours

Player

Club

C.D. FAS
 Primera División
 Champion: Apertura 2004

C.D. Águila
 Primera División
 Runners-up: Clausura 2010

A.D. Isidro Metapán
 Primera División
 Champion: Apertura 2012, Apertura 2013, Clausura 2014, Apertura 2014

Individual
Salvadoran Primera División Top Scorer (6): 2004 (A), 2007 (C), 2009 (C), Apertura 2011, Clausura 2012, Apertura 2012
CCL Golden Boot (1): 2012-13

References

External links
 
 Profile - Isidro Metapán 
 El Grafico Profile 
 Player Bio 
 Soccerway 

1981 births
Living people
Sportspeople from Panama City
Association football forwards
Panamanian footballers
Panama international footballers
2007 CONCACAF Gold Cup players
2009 CONCACAF Gold Cup players
2014 Copa Centroamericana players
Sporting San Miguelito players
C.D. Árabe Unido players
Envigado F.C. players
C.D. Chalatenango footballers
C.D. FAS footballers
C.D. Águila footballers
Alianza F.C. footballers
C.D. Vista Hermosa footballers
A.D. Isidro Metapán footballers
Panamanian expatriate footballers
Expatriate footballers in Colombia
Expatriate footballers in El Salvador